Sepulcros de Miel (English: Tombs of Honey) is the twenty-first release by Omar Rodríguez-López, guitarist, band leader, and producer of The Mars Volta Group. Released under the Omar Rodriguez Lopez Quartet name, this record features fellow Mars Volta members Juan Alderete & Marcel Rodriguez-Lopez as well as John Frusciante. The record was digitally released May 30, 2010, with a vinyl release to follow, scheduled to ship around August 15. Vinyl copies were finished early and supplied on July 15, 1,000 copies on purple vinyl and 1,000 copies on orange vinyl. Like Omar Rodriguez-Lopez & John Frusciante, this album was originally made available as a free download from Omar's Bandcamp page with the option to donate money to "Keep Music In Schools" program. Later, free purchase option was replaced by a minimum price of $4.99. Similar to the Omar Rodriguez-Lopez & Lydia Lunch, this album consists of a single lengthy piece divided into several parts.

Track listing

Personnel
 Omar Rodríguez-López – synthesizers, guitar, sound manipulation
 John Frusciante – guitar
 Adrián Terrazas-González – saxophone (uncredited)
 Juan Alderete – bass
 Marcel Rodriguez-Lopez – drums, percussion, keyboards, electronics (intro & outro)

Release history

References

2010 albums
Omar Rodríguez-López albums
John Frusciante albums
Collaborative albums
Albums free for download by copyright owner
Sargent House albums
Albums produced by Omar Rodríguez-López